Viktor Ninov (born 19 June 1988, Cherven Bryag) is a Bulgarian athlete competing in the high jump.

As a junior, he finished thirteenth at the 2009 European U23 Championships.

He later competed at the 2010 European Championships, the 2011 European Indoor Championships, the 2011 World Championships, the 2012 World Indoor Championships, the 2012 European Championships, the 2012 Olympic Games and the 2013 European Indoor Championships without ever reaching the final.

His personal best jump is 2.29 metres, achieved in July 2011 in Plovdiv. Indoors he has recorded 2.30 metres in February 2013 in Prague.

Competition record

References 

1988 births
Living people
Bulgarian male high jumpers
Athletes (track and field) at the 2012 Summer Olympics
Olympic athletes of Bulgaria
People from Cherven Bryag